The 2005 AFL draft was the 2005 event of the AFL draft, the annual draft of players by Australian rules football teams that participate in the main competition of that sport, the Australian Football League. The 2005 draft consisted of a pre-season draft, a national draft, a trade period and a rookie elevation.

In 2005, there were 76 picks to be drafted amongst 16 teams in the national draft. The Carlton Blues received the first pick in the national draft after finishing on the bottom of the ladder during the 2005 AFL season. This was their first ever priority draft pick after the drama of 2002 when they lost draft picks for breaching the salary cap.

In addition to the national draft, the 2005/06 off-season featured trade week (prior to the national draft) and pre-season and rookie drafts (following the national draft).

Key Dates

Trades

2005 national draft

2006 pre-season draft

The 2006 pre-season draft was held on 13 December 2005. For the pre-season draft held in 2004, known as the 2005 pre-season draft, see 2004 AFL draft.

2006 rookie draft

References
AFL Draft History
National draft list
Pre-season draft list
Rookie draft list

Australian Football League draft
AFL Draft
AFL Draft
2000s in Melbourne
Australian rules football in Victoria (Australia)
Sport in Melbourne
Events in Melbourne